General Ferguson or Fergusson may refer to:

Sir Charles Fergusson, 7th Baronet (1865–1951), British Army general
Frank Kerby Fergusson (1874–1937), U.S. Air Force brigadier general
Harley Bascom Ferguson (1875–1968), U.S. Army major general
James Ferguson (general) (1913–2000), U.S. Air Force general
James Fergusson (British Army officer) (1787–1865), British Army general
Samuel W. Ferguson (1834–1917), Confederate States Army brigadier general